This is a cumulative list of previously used tropical cyclone (tropical storm and hurricane) names which have been permanently removed from reuse in the North Atlantic region. As of April 2022, 94 storm names have been retired.
 	
The naming of North Atlantic tropical cyclones is currently under the oversight of the Hurricane Committee of the World Meteorological Organization (WMO). This group maintains six alphabetic lists of twenty-one names, with one list used each year. This normally results in each name being reused every six years. However, in the case of a particularly deadly or damaging storm, that storm's name is retired, and a replacement starting with the same letter is selected to take its place. The decision whether to remove a name in a given season is made at the annual session of the WMO Hurricane Committee in the spring of the following year.

The practice of retiring storm names was begun by the United States Weather Bureau in 1955, after major hurricanes Carol, Edna, and Hazel struck the Northeastern United States during the previous year. Initially their names were retired for 10 years, after which time they could be reintroduced; however, in 1969, the policy was changed to have the names retired permanently. In 1977, the United States National Oceanic and Atmospheric Administration (NOAA) transferred control of the naming lists to the Hurricane Committee.

Since the formal start of naming during the 1947 Atlantic hurricane season, an average of one Atlantic storm name has been retired each year, though many seasons (most recently 2014) did not have any names retired. As of completion of the 2021 season, there has been one hurricane season (the 2005 season) to result in five names being retired, and four hurricane seasons (1955, 1995, 2004, and 2017) to result in four names being retired. The most names retired for a decade was 24 in the 2000s, followed by the 16 retirements resulting from hurricanes in the 2010s. The deadliest storm to have its name retired was Hurricane Mitch, which caused over 10,000 fatalities when it struck Central America during October 1998. The costliest storms were hurricanes Katrina in August 2005 and Harvey in August 2017; each storm struck the U.S. Gulf Coast, causing $125 billion in damage, much of it from flooding. The most recently retired storm name was Ida.

Background

By 1947, tropical cyclones developing in the North Atlantic Ocean were named by the United States Army Air Forces in private communications between weather centres and aircraft using the Phonetic alphabet. This practice continued until September 1950, when the names started to be used publicly after three hurricanes (Baker, Dog, Easy) had occurred simultaneously and caused confusion within the media and the public. Public use of the phonetic alphabet continued until the 1953 Interdepartmental Hurricane Conference, where the decision was made to start using a new list of female names during that season, as a second phonetic alphabet had been developed. During the active but mild 1953 Atlantic hurricane season, the names were readily used in the press with few objections recorded; as a result, the same names were reused during the next year with only one change: Gilda for Gail. Over the next six years a new list of names was developed ahead of each season, before in 1960 forecasters developed four alphabetical sets and repeated them every four years. These new sets followed the example of the typhoon names and excluded names beginning with the letters Q, U, X, Y, and Z, and keeping them to female names only.

In 1955, it was decided to start retiring the names of significant tropical cyclones for 10 years after which they might be reintroduced, with the names Carol and Edna reintroduced ahead of the 1965 and 1968 hurricane seasons respectively. At the 1969 Interdepartmental hurricane conference the naming lists were revised after it was decided that the names Carol, Edna and Hazel would be permanently retired because of their importance to the research community. It was also decided that any significant hurricane in the future would also be permanently retired. Ahead of the 1971 Atlantic hurricane season, 10 lists of hurricane names were inaugurated, by the National Oceanic and Atmospheric Administration. In 1977 it was decided that the World Meteorological Organization's Hurricane Committee (WMO) would control the names used, who subsequently decided that six lists of names would be used in the Atlantic Ocean from 1979 onwards with male names included. Since 1979 the same six lists have been used by the United States National Hurricane Center (NHC) to name systems, with names of significant tropical cyclones retired from the lists permanently and replaced with new names as required at the following year's hurricane committee meeting.

At present, the name of any tropical cyclone may be retired or withdrawn from the list of names at the request of a member state, if it acquires notoriety for various reasons including the number of deaths, amount of damages or other impacts. The committee subsequently discuss the proposal and either through building consensus or a majority vote decides if the name should be retired or withdrawn. In March 2017, members of the British Caribbean Territories proposed that a third retirement criterion be added: the tropical cyclone must have sustained winds of at least . This came in light of the retirement of Tropical Storm Erika in 2015 which caused catastrophic flooding and mudslides in Dominica without producing sustained tropical storm-force winds on the island. No action has been taken on this proposal yet.

Formerly, if a season's primary list of names was fully used, subsequent storms would be assigned names based on the letters of the Greek alphabet. According to the WMO's initial policy established in 2006, Greek-letter named storms could never be retired, "lest an irreplaceable chunk be taken out of the alphabet." Therefore, devastating 2020 hurricanes Eta and Iota would have been retired as "Eta 2020" and "Iota 2020" respectively, but the letter names themselves would remain available for use whenever Greek alphabet letter names were needed again in subsequent years. However, this plan was never implemented, as the names Eta and Iota were both formally retired without the year descriptor by the WMO in 2021. The organization also abandoned the Greek alphabet auxiliary list in favor of a new auxiliary naming list.

Names retired in the 1950s

Between 1954 and 1959, eight names were deemed significant enough to be retired for 10 years due to their impact, before being permanently retired after 1969. There were no names retired for the 1956, 1958, and 1959 seasons. The deadliest hurricane was Hurricane Janet, which killed at least 1,023 people, while the costliest was Hurricane Diane, which caused  in damage.

Names retired in the 1960s

In 1960, four rotating lists of names were developed to avoid having to create new lists each year, while the practice of retiring any particularly damaging storm names for 10 years continued, with 11 names deemed significant enough to be retired during the decade. At the 1969 Hurricane Warning Conference, the National Hurricane Center requested that Carol, Edna, Hazel, and Inez be permanently retired due to their importance to the research community. This request was subsequently accepted and led to today's practice of retiring names of significant tropical cyclones permanently. There were no names retired for the 1962 and 1968 seasons.

Names retired in the 1970s

Starting in 1979, the World Meteorological Organization began assigning both male and female names to tropical cyclones. This decade featured hurricanes David and Frederic, the first male Atlantic hurricane names to be retired. During this decade, 9 storms were deemed significant enough to have their names retired. Together these 9 systems caused at least  in damage, while at least  people lost their lives. There were no names retired for the 1971, 1973, and 1976 seasons.

Names retired in the 1980s

After control of naming of hurricanes was turned over to the World Meteorological Organization's Hurricane Committee during the mid-1970s, the 1980s marked the least prolific decade in terms of the number of retired storms with 7 names warranting removal. Hurricane Gilbert was the most intense tropical cyclone during the decade by pressure, with a minimum value of 888 hPa (26.22 inHg). This was the lowest recorded pressure in a North Atlantic hurricane until Hurricane Wilma surpassed it during 2005. In addition, Hurricane Allen was the most intense tropical cyclone during the decade by wind speed, with maximum 1–minute sustained winds of 190 mph (305 km/h). This remains the highest sustained wind speed of any Atlantic hurricane on record. There were no names retired for the 1981, 1982, 1984, 1986, and 1987 seasons, which was the most of any decade since the introduction of the practice of retiring hurricane names.

Names retired in the 1990s

During the 1990s, the Atlantic Ocean moved into its active era, which led to more tropical cyclones forming during the hurricane seasons. The decade featured Hurricane Andrew which at the time was the costliest hurricane on record, and also Hurricane Mitch which is considered to be the deadliest tropical cyclone to have its name retired, killing over 11,000 people in Central America. A total of 15 names were retired in this decade, with seven of those during the 1995 and 1996 seasons. There were no names retired for the 1993, 1994 and 1997 seasons.

Names retired in the 2000s

After the Atlantic basin had moved into the warm phase of the Atlantic multidecadal oscillation during the mid-1990s, the 2000s marked the most prolific decade in terms of the number of retired storms, with 24 names warranting removal. Katrina was also the deadliest hurricane to strike the United States since the 1928 Okeechobee hurricane. Hurricane Jeanne was the deadliest storm during the decade and was responsible for over 3000 deaths, when it impacted Haiti and other parts of the Caribbean as a tropical storm and minimal hurricane. There were no names retired for the 2006 and 2009 seasons.

Names retired in the 2010s

Some of the most devastating hurricanes to hit the United States in recorded history did so in the 2010s, a decade in which 30 named storms were classified as major hurricanes (out of 152 named storms). Altogether, 16 tropical cyclone names were retired during the 2010s. Collectively, these systems killed at least  people and caused at least  worth of damage. Among them, Hurricane Maria was the most intense tropical cyclone by pressure, with a minimum value of 908 hPa (26.81 inHg), as well as the deadliest, with 3,057 fatalities directly or indirectly caused by Maria. Hurricane Dorian was the most intense in terms of wind speed, with maximum sustained winds of 185 mph (295 km/h). Hurricane Harvey was the decade's costliest system, as well as the costliest overall, tied with 2005's Katrina. There were no names retired for the 2014 season.

Names retired in the 2020s

Four tropical cyclone names have been retired so far in the 2020s. Hurricane Laura was the costliest hurricane of the 2020 season, causing over $19 billion in damages, much of which occurred along the southwestern Louisiana coast as a result of its  storm surge. Hurricanes Eta and  Iota both made landfall in Nicaragua, with Iota doing so with maximum sustained winds near . Each brought torrential rain and then flooding to much of Central America.

Names retired by letter

The table below lists the storm names that have been retired since the practice began. As of 2022, 12 storms with names beginning with the letter 'I' have been retired, while no names beginning with 'V' have been retired (or 'Q', 'U', 'X', 'Y' and 'Z', which are not used in the Atlantic). The names in each row of the "Storm names" column are displayed in chronological order.

Names retired by month

The table below lists the storm names that have been retired since the practice began. As of 2022, 34 storms that have formed in the month of August have had their names retired, the most of any month in the season. The month of June has had only three retired, the least of any month in the season. To date, no Atlantic storm forming in a month outside of the season has had its name retired. The earliest forming storm to have had its name retired is Allison in 2001 which formed on June 5, and the latest forming storm to be retired is Otto in 2016, which formed on November 20. The names in each row of the "Storm names" column are displayed in chronological order.

See also
 Lists of Atlantic hurricanes
 List of historical tropical cyclone names
 List of retired Pacific hurricane names
 List of retired Pacific typhoon names
 List of retired Philippine typhoon names
 List of retired Australian region cyclone names
 List of retired South Pacific cyclone names

Notes

References

External links
 National Hurricane Center's Post-Season Reports
 NHC's list of deadliest hurricanes
 NHC's list of costliest US hurricanes, current as of April 8, 2020

 
Atlantic hurricanes retired
Retired hurricane names